This article documents the 2009–10 season for North London football club Barnet.

Appearances and goals

|}

Transfers

Out

In

Loans out

Loans in

Fixtures and results

League Two

League Cup

First round

Football League Trophy

Southern Section First Round

Southern Section Second Round

FA Cup

First round

Second round

Second Round Replay

References 

Barnet
Barnet F.C. seasons